Similar letters: 

Uk (Ѹ ѹ; italics: Ѹ ѹ or Оу оу) is a digraph of the early Cyrillic alphabet, although commonly considered and used as a single letter. It is an accent nasal vowel from Slavonic language. To save space, it was often written as a vertical ligature (Ꙋ ꙋ), called "monograph Uk".  In modern times,  has been replaced by the simple .

Development of the use of Uk in Old East Slavic 

One can see this development in the Novgorod birch-bark letters: The degree to which this letter was used here differed in two positions: in word-initial position or before a vowel (except for the jers), and after a consonant.

Before a consonant,  was used 89% of the time in the writings before 1100. From the late 14th century on, there are no more instances of  being used in this position, with  appearing 95% of the time.

The decrease in usage was more gradual after a consonant. The frequency of  remained steady between 47% and 44% until 1400, when it experienced another decrease to 32%. Meanwhile, the use of  increased from 4% in the early 13th century, to 20% by the mid-13th century, 38% by the mid 14th century, and 58% by the early 15th century.

Representation on computers 

It was later recognized that the glyph to be used for the letter had not been adequately specified, and it had been represented as either a digraph or monograph letter in different released fonts. There was also the difficulty that in written texts the letter may appear in lowercase (ѹ), uppercase (Ѹ), or in all caps (ОУ), which is possible to be used for heading.

To resolve this ambiguity, Unicode 5.1 has deprecated the use of the original code points, introduced U+A64A and A64B, CYRILLIC CAPITAL/SMALL LETTER MONOGRAPH UK (Ꙋ ꙋ), and recommends composing the digraph with two individual characters +.

Unicode 9.0 has also introduced U+1C82 CYRILLIC SMALL LETTER NARROW O which can also be used for composing the digraph form (+) and U+1C88 CYRILLIC SMALL LETTER UNBLENDED UK (ᲈ) as a variant of monograph form.

However, the recommended method may cause some text representation problems. The letter У did not originally appear alone in the Old Church Slavonic orthography, and thus its code point was replaced in different Old Slavonic computer fonts with digraph or monograph forms of the Uk or with the tailed form of Izhitsa. Tailed Izhitsa may be used as a part of the digraph, but using the shape of the monograph Uk as a part of the digraph Uk (оꙋ) is incorrect.

The minuscule monograph Uk was used in the Romanian Transitional Alphabet to represent , but due to font restrictions, the Ȣ ligature or Latin gamma are occasionally used instead.

Computing codes

References

Further reading

 Kaplan, Michael S. “Every character has a story #10: U+0478/U+0479 (CYRILLIC LETTER UK)”, May 21, 2005.
 Zaliznyak, Andrey (2004). Drevnenovgorodskij dialekt. Moscow: Jazyki slavjanskoj kul'tury.

Cyrillic ligatures